Hong Kong Nepalese Football Association (HKNFA) are an all-star association football club composed of top flight Nepalese players from various football clubs in Hong Kong. They regularly participate in the major tournament in Nepal, the Budha Subba Gold Cup.

History
The Hong Kong Nepalese Football Association (HKNFA) was founded in 2008 with the aim of promoting football within the Nepalese communities in Hong Kong, especially among the youth. Deurali Football Club is one of the football clubs under HKNFA. It encourages Nepalese youth to play association football and makes a pure Nepalese football team participate in the Hong Kong League.

Squad

Statistics

See also
Football in Nepal
African United Club

External links
HKNFA vs Nepal Police Club (2013 Budha Subba Gold Cup)

References

Football clubs in Nepal
Football clubs in Hong Kong
2008 establishments in Nepal